Bagramyan or Baghramyan or Bagramian or in Western Armenian Pagramian is an Armenian surname meaning "son of Bagram". It may refer to:

People
Movses Baghramian, 18th-century Armenian liberation movement leader
Hovhannes Bagramyan, Marshal of the Soviet Union
Aleksandr Baghramyan, Marshal of the Soviet Union

Places
Baghramyan, Ararat, Armenia
Baghramyan, Armavir, Armenia
Baghramyan, Echmiadzin, Armenia

Other
Bagramyan Battalion, Armenian battalion during War in Abkhazia (1992–1993)
Pagramian SC, a Lebanese-Armenian sports and cultural club (1944 to 1960), affiliated with the Lebanese Communist Party

Armenian-language surnames